Post-Attack Command and Control System Facility, Hadley is a defunct Post-Attack Command and Control System facility that operated from June 2, 1958 until 1970. It is located on and under Bare Mountain in Hadley, Massachusetts. The facility was known by many different names: 8th Air Force Combat Operations Center (COC), "The Notch", and "Westover Communications Annex" since it was related to nearby Westover Air Force Base.

It was designed to house 135 people.

History
In 1957, Strategic Air Command began construction for a hardened bunker to contain the command post for the 8th Air Force, which was located at nearby Westover Air Force Base, Chicopee, Massachusetts.  The facility was located inside Bare Mountain, off Route 116, and was nicknamed "The Notch."  The underground facility, built into the side of Bare Mountain, was hardened to protect it from the effects of a nearby nuclear blast and designed so that the senior military staff could facilitate further military operations.

It was connected to ATT Blackstone, ATT Chesterfield, and ATT Peru via microwave transmissions during its operation.

Reuse
The facility was shut down in 1970, when the 8th Air Force was relocated to Guam. After the U.S. Air Force abandoned the site in 1970, the Federal Reserve took over and used it as a secure storage facility for their records. Allegedly they stored large sums of money there as well, to be used to restart the economy after a nuclear war.

Today, the bunker is used as a library storage facility for the Five Colleges.

The facility was used in the 2010 Mel Gibson movie Edge of Darkness. The front entrance of the facility stood in for the main entrance of the Northmoor Facility in the movie and the access road, Military Road, was used in the beginning of the pursuit scene where Gibson's character begins his chase of the facility director.

Units based there
 8th Air Force (1958–1970)
 814th Combat Defense Squadron (1958–1968)
 99th Security Police Squadron (1968–1970)

See also
 Continuity of government
 Magic Mountain
 Post Attack Command and Control System
 List of military installations in Massachusetts

References

External links

 "The Notch" PACCS installation, with photos of the facility when it was active
 Westover Joint Air Reserve Base (JARB), GlobalSecurity.org
 "The Notch" - Westover Communications Annex - PACCS
 "Library Holdings Moving Underground", Smith College news
 814th Combat Defense Squadron - Air Police squadron that guarded "The Notch"
 A 1990s era photo of the entrance
 Bare Mountain: Go inside Amherst College's bunker (Photos)

Amherst College
Buildings and structures in Hadley, Massachusetts
Installations of the United States Air Force in Massachusetts
Continuity of government in the United States
Nuclear bunkers in the United States
United States nuclear command and control
1958 establishments in Massachusetts
1970 disestablishments in Massachusetts